Ryatush (Rätüş) is a rural locality (a village) in Novosubayevsky Selsoviet, Nurimanovsky District, Bashkortostan, Russia. The population was 7 as of 2010. There is 1 street.

Geography 
Ryatush is located 28 km southeast of Krasnaya Gorka (the district's administrative centre) by road. Novoisayevo is the nearest rural locality.

References 

Rural localities in Nurimanovsky District